The 1993 Nike Tour season was the fourth season of the Nike Tour, the PGA Tour's official developmental tour (now known as the Korn Ferry Tour), and the first season sponsored by Nike. The top ten players on the final money list earned PGA Tour cards for 1994.

Schedule
The following table lists official events during the 1993 season.

Money leaders
For full rankings, see 1993 Nike Tour graduates.

The money list was based on prize money won during the season, calculated in U.S. dollars. The top 10 players on the tour earned status to play on the 1994 PGA Tour.

Awards

See also
1993 Nike Tour graduates

Notes

References

Korn Ferry Tour seasons
Nike Tour